The 2006–07 Heineken Cup pool stage was played from October 2006 through to January 2007. The top team in each group qualified for the quarter-finals automatically as seeds 1–6, while the two remaining spots in the quarter-finals were filled by the two runners-up with the greatest points totals.

All times are local to the game site.

Pool 1

Notes:
 London Wasps earned the third seed over Leicester Tigers on the first possible tiebreaker, scoring 23 tries in pool play to Leicester's 22.

Pool 2

Pool 3

Pool 4

Notes:
 Leicester Tigers win the pool on the second tiebreaker of head-to-head tries, 3–2.

Pool 5

Notes:
 Llanelli Scarlets become only the fifth team in the history of the Heineken Cup to win all their pool matches (after Wasps in 1997–98, Bath in 2000–01, and Leinster in both 2002–03 and 2004–05). They also set a record for most points earned in pool play since the competition adopted a bonus-point system in 2003–04. This record would be broken about two hours later by Biarritz.

Pool 6

Notes:
 Biarritz failed in their effort to become the first club since the Heineken Cup adopted the bonus-point system in 2003–04 to score bonus-point wins in all their pool matches, but did become the sixth team to win all their pool matches.

Seeding and runners-up

Pool Stage
Heineken Cup pool stages